The murder of Hannah Williams was an English case in which a 14-year-old schoolgirl, Hannah Williams (May 1986 – c. 21 April 2001), was murdered after going missing during a shopping trip on 21 April 2001. Robert Howard, a convicted sex offender suspected of other murders including in his native Ireland, was convicted in 2003 and sentenced to life in prison for her murder.

Disappearance 
On 21 April 2001 Hannah Williams told her mother that she was going window shopping in Deptford, but never returned home. For a long time it was presumed that Williams had run away, and the search was not helped by the fact that a friend reported seeing her long after she had probably been killed.

Discovery of body and conviction of killer 
Williams's body was discovered on 15 March 2002 at a cement works in an industrial area of Northfleet, Kent, beside the Thames estuary. Initially it was speculated that the body was that of Danielle Jones, who had been missing from East Tilbury in Essex since 18 June 2001, but Williams's clothing led to a correct identification. The discovery of Williams's body also overlapped with the investigation into the disappearance, and later murder, of Milly Dowler from Surrey, who vanished on 21 March 2002.

Robert Howard, a convicted sex offender who had known Williams since 1999, was arrested on 23 March 2002, eight days after her body was found. At his trial at Maidstone Crown Court in October 2003, Howard was found guilty of raping and murdering Williams, and was sentenced to life imprisonment. No minimum term was reported to have been recommended by the trial judge, and there have been no reports of a minimum term subsequently issued by the High Court.

Robert Howard 
Robert Lesarian Howard, of Wolfhill, a village in County Laois, Republic of Ireland, was born on 20 April 1944. Howard was first convicted of burglary at the age of 13, and at 19 was convicted of attempted rape of a 6-year-old girl in London. He served prison terms for attempted rape and strangulation in London and for burglary and rape in Cork, and was a police suspect in several disappearances of women and girls, including that of Jo Jo Dullard of Callan and Annie McCarrick, a New York tourist in County Wicklow. In 1993, the same year as McCarrick's disappearance, Howard was convicted of unlawful carnal knowledge of a girl under 17 in the case of a 16-year-old in Castlederg, County Tyrone, in Northern Ireland whom he had been accused of raping. 

On 14 August 1994, while he was on bail, 15-year-old Arlene Arkinson, who was also from Castlederg, went missing in Bundoran, County Donegal. She was last seen in a car that Howard was driving. Arkinson is presumed dead, but her body has not been found. Howard was arrested six weeks after her disappearance and was tried in 2005 on charges of murdering her; he was acquitted by the jury, who had not been informed of his previous offences or his conviction for Williams's murder. (The jury in his trial for Williams's murder had heard evidence regarding his grooming both Arkinson and Williams after befriending family members.) An inquest into Arkison's death began in Belfast in February 2016 and included testimony that his earlier offences made him "extremely dangerous" to Arkinson by the time she disappeared. A second inquest in 2021 found him responsible for Arkinson's murder; the coroner also ruled that the police should have arrested him immediately given his known history. Howard died in prison on 2 October 2015 at the age of 71.

See also
List of solved missing person cases

References

2000s in Kent
2001 murders in the United Kingdom
2001 in England
April 2001 events in the United Kingdom
Deaths by person in England
Female murder victims
Formerly missing people
Incidents of violence against girls
Incidents of violence against women
Missing person cases in England
Murder in Kent
Murder trials
Rape in England